Trefasser (variations: Tref-Asser, or Trêf Asser, or Asserton; translation: "town" of "Asser") is a hamlet, located to the west of Fishguard in western Wales. Historically, it is part of the parish of Llanwnda. It lies on the coast of St George's Channel within the Pembrokeshire Coast National Park. A stream named Cledde Goch runs close by.

Trefasser's farms, houses and cottages are the only settled area of Pen Caer. David Tress has painted the place in an abstract painting.

History

Trefasser was mentioned in the survey of episcopal lands in 1326. It at one time belonged to  Major Thomas Askwith Jenkins (1809–1877) of Trevigin.

In July 2009, the body of a 47-year-old man from Stourbridge in the West Midlands was found at the bottom of the cliffs of Trefasser.

Etymology
There are opposing views as to from whom the name derives. One possibility is that it is the namesake of Bishop Asser, a friend and biographer of King Alfred in the 9th century. Another possibility is that it is named for Asser's nephew, Asser Meneventsis, as Trefasser is said to be his birthplace. Meneventsis was a Benedictine monk, as well as scribe and chancellor to Asser.

Castell Poeth
A tumulus named Castell Poeth ("the Hot Castle") is located nearby. It is an exploratory castelet with an occasional beacon.

References

Villages in Pembrokeshire